is a 1950 Japanese film written and directed by Akira Kurosawa. The film stars Toshirō Mifune, Takashi Shimura and Shirley Yamaguchi.

Plot
Ichiro Aoye (Toshiro Mifune), an artist, meets a famous young classical singer, Miyako Saijo (Shirley Yamaguchi) while he is working on a painting in the mountains. She is on foot, having missed her bus, but they discover they are staying at the same hotel, so Aoye gives Saijo a ride back to town on his motorcycle. On the way, they are spotted by paparazzi from the tabloid magazine Amour. Saijo refuses to grant the photographers an interview, so they plot their revenge and are able to take a picture of Aoye and Saijo on the balcony of her room and print it along with a fabricated story under the headline "The Love Story of Miyako Saijo".

Aoye is outraged by this false scandal and plans to sue the magazine. During the subsequent media circus, he is approached by a down-and-out lawyer, Hiruta (Takashi Shimura), who claims to share Aoye's anger with the press. Aoye hires Hiruta as his attorney, but Hiruta is desperate for money to care for his daughter, Masako (Yōko Katsuragi), who has a terminal case of tuberculosis, so he accepts a bribe from the editor of Amour in exchange for agreeing to throw the trial. The trial proceeds badly for the plaintiffs and Hiruta, struck by the kindness of Aoye and Saijo towards Masako and Masako's disgust at the way he is handling the case, becomes ridden with guilt. Masako dies near the end of the trial, convinced that Aoye and Saijo will win, since they have the truth on their side. On the final day in court Hiruta, prodded by his conscience, confesses to taking the bribe and Amour loses the case.

Cast
 Toshiro Mifune - Ichirō Aoye
 Takashi Shimura - Attorney Hiruta
 Yoshiko Yamaguchi - Miyako Saijo
 Noriko Sengoku - Sumie
 Yōko Katsuragi - Masako Hiruta
 Eitaro Ozawa - Hori
 Shinichi Himori - Editor Asai
 Ichiro Shimizu - Arai
 Fumiko Okamura - Miyako's mother
 Masao Shimizu - Judge
 Kokuten Kōdō - Old Man
 Bokuzen Hidari - Drunk
 Kōji Mitsui - Photographer

Commentary
Scandal was described by Kurosawa himself as a protest film about "the rise of the press in Japan and its habitual confusion of freedom with license. Personal privacy is never respected and the scandal sheets are the worst offenders." The movie depicts aspects of so-called kasutori culture, a phenomenon of early postwar Japan that refers to the proliferation of sleazy magazines and cheap alcohol.

References

External links

 
Scandal at Rotten Tomatoes
 Scandal  at the Japanese Movie Database

1950 films
1950s Christmas drama films
1950s Christmas films
Films directed by Akira Kurosawa
Japanese black-and-white films
Shochiku films
Films set in 1949
Films set in 1950
Films with screenplays by Akira Kurosawa
Films with screenplays by Ryuzo Kikushima
Films scored by Fumio Hayasaka
Japanese Christmas drama films
Films set around New Year
1950s Japanese films